The 2007 National Camogie League is a competition in the women's team field sport of camogie was won by Cork, who defeated Wexford in the final, played at Nowlan Park.

The Final
A late Jennifer O'Leary pointed free brought the title to Cork. Wexford started strongly to hold a 0-8 to 0-3 half time lead thanks to good work in the midfield sector from Kate Kelly and Caroline Murphy, but Cork came back resolutely in the second half.
Maire Ni Scollai reported in the Irish Independent: A spectacular goal-scoring spree from both sides between the 48th and 58th minutes ensured that the crowd were on the edge of their seats throughout.irish Independent May 7 2007
Goals from Jennifer O'Leary, Una O'Donoghue and Síle Burns within five minutes gave Cork a 3-6 to 0-9 lead with seven minutes to go, but two goals from Wexford full-forward Michelle Hearn meant the sides were level as the game headed for injury-time and O'Leary's late winner.
Wexford defeated Cork by 4-12 to 0-14 in the opening round of the championship six days later Rebels routed as Wexford hit back with a vengeance and went on to reverse the result in the All-Ireland final a few months later.

Division 2
The Division 2 final, known until 2005 as the National Junior League, was won by Limerick who defeated Cork intermediates in the final. The Division 3 final was won by Waterford who defeated Down by two points in the final.

Final stages

References

External links
 Camogie Association

National Camogie League
2007